The King in a Rookery is the second album from Christian rock band Pivitplex.

Track listing 
 End Of The Line
 Hello Monday
 One Goodbye
 Its Our Time
 The Deal
 I'm Alive
 Long Way Down
 Everythings OK
 Final Straw
 Here and Now
 Gravity
 I Concede

References

External links 
http://www.purevolume.com/pivitplex

2006 albums